The 2000 Melbourne Storm season was the third in the club's history. They competed in the NRL's 2000 Premiership and finished the regular season in sixth place, being eliminated in the first week of the finals.

The Storm began 2000 with an easy win over St. Helens in the World Club Challenge. It was a great start for Melbourne, but overall the 2000 season was a disappointment. Major injuries to Marcus Bai and Robbie Ross, along with a lengthy suspension to Stephen Kearney, seriously disrupted the season.

It was made worse when the club was forced to negotiate its way through the trials and tribulations of 12 players coming off contract by the end of the year. Most distracting was the contractual saga of Brett Kimmorley as he travelled between Melbourne, Sydney and Brisbane in search of his future (much to the bewilderment of the Victorian public who were not used to rugby league's mid-season mayhem).

With respectable home crowds averaging over 14,000 the Storm finished the 2000 season in sixth place, earning themselves a semi-final against the Newcastle Knights in Newcastle. However, the defending premiers exited with a 30–16 loss on a wet and miserable afternoon. The season's undoubted highlight was the grand final rematch against the Dragons at the MCG where the Storm won by an incredible scoreline of 70–10.

Tony Martin (to London) and Brett Kimmorley (to Northern Eagles) were key losses for the club in the lead up to 2001 which were slightly off-set by the arrival of half-back Matt Orford and winger Junior Langi.

Season Summary

 Pre Season – 1999 NRL Grand Final winger Craig Smith announces his retirement. 
 World Club Challenge – Melbourne thrash St Helens 44–6 in frigid conditions. Robbie Kearns captains the team, while Dane Morgan scores a try in his first official game for the club. Halfback Brett Kimmorley wins the man of the match award.
 7 February – Team manager Mick Moore dies in tragic circumstances in Auckland on the evening after Melbourne's 2000 NRL season opening loss against Auckland Warriors. Moore was socialising with team officials when he fell from a wharf. Moore's funeral is held in Brisbane on 10 February.
 25 February – Coach Chris Anderson is reappointed Kangaroos coach for 2000.
 29 February – St George Illawarra Dragons'  Anthony Mundine trash talks Melbourne ahead of the 1999 Grand Final rematch at the MCG by declaring "I don't feel the Storm deserved to win the grand final."
 3 March – In a further provocation, Mundine writes in a weekly newspaper column that "I think they (the Storm) are nothing but pretenders. Many critics are saying some of the statement I make do nothing but fire up the opposition.  That's exactly what I want to do. I don't want Melbourne to come up with any excuses. I want them to be at their best. I want them to be fired up and I want St George Illawarra to crush them because nothing is sweeter than revenge."
 Round 5 – Snapping a four-game losing streak to start the season, Melbourne humiliate St George Illawarra 70–10 at the MCG in a stunning rebuttal against Anthony Mundine. The 70 points sets a new club record, and the 60-point margin also is a new club record. Melbourne became only the fourth team in Australian rugby league history to score 70+ points. Glenn Lazarus parades the NRL premiership trophy before the game, having retired at the end of the 1999 season.
 Round 6 – A second successive first half blitz sees Melbourne lead 30–0 against Sydney Roosters, before going on to win 42–10.
 9 March – Chris Anderson signs a new three-year contract to stay with Melbourne.
 Round 7 – Marcus Bai suffers a serious arm laceration in a collision with the advertising signage at Olympic Park.
 Round 8 – Cronulla-Sutherland Sharks forward Jason Stevens accuses Ben Roarty of biting him during the game. NRL Judiciary Commissioner Jim Hall later dismisses the charge due to a lack of evidence after Stevens refuses to advance with the allegations. 
 16 April – Chairman John Ribot tells the media that the absence of a fixed schedule of matches costs each club in excess of $4m annually.
 12 May –  Robbie Ross is ruled out for the rest of the season with a serious knee injury.
 Round 14 – Missing 11 players through Origin selection and injury, Melbourne hand debuts to a number of players, including drafting in Brook Martin from Queensland Cup team Easts Tigers.
 Round 15 – Stephen Kearney and Marcus Bai are placed on report for a dangerous spear tackle on Wests Tigers forward Jarrod McCracken. The tackle inflicts a serious neck injury on McCracken. Kearney is later suspended for eight matches, with Bai receiving a one match suspension, after pleading guilty at the NRL Judiciary.
 Round 16 – Again depleted by Origin selection, Melbourne score a famous last-second win of 16–12 over a similarly depleted Brisbane Broncos.  Kevin Carmichael threw the final pass to Peter Robinson to score a try next to the posts, in what fans dubbed the Norths Devils win over the Toowoomba Clydesdales after both teams' feeder clubs in the Queensland Cup competition.
 28 May – Despite being under contract, it is reported in The Sun-Herald that Melbourne has granted Brett Kimmorley permission to negotiate with rival clubs.
 4 June – Marcus Bai signs a new three-year deal to stay with Melbourne.
 Round 18 – St George Illawarra inflict Melbourne's worst defeat and highest score conceded, thrashing Storm 50–4 in Wollongong. The reversal of fortunes coming just 13 weeks after the 70–10 game at the MCG. Melbourne again were missing a number of players due to Origin selection.
 Round 20 – Matt Geyer equals his own club record with four tries in a game, as Melbourne thrash Auckland 56–10 to win the Michael Moore Trophy.
 26 June –  Tony Martin announces he will be leaving Melbourne at the end of the 2000 season to play with the London Broncos.
 4 July – Coach Chris Anderson accuses Brett Kimmorley of betrayal after Kimmorley announces he has signed a two-year deal with Northern Eagles.
 Round 23 – Days after the death of Canterbury-Bankstown Bulldogs patriarch Peter "Bullfrog" Moore the father-in-law of both coaches; Melbourne lose to Canterbury 22–31 in what Chris Anderson called the "worst performance in the three years we've been here." In a unique milestone, Danny Williams becomes the first player to register 100 games off the interchange bench in Australian rugby league history.
 Round 24 – Rodney Howe becomes the first Melbourne player to be sent off. Howe is sent from the field for a high tackle on Geoff Toovey by referee Sean Hampstead, but has the charges dropped by the NRL Judiciary.
 19 July – Matt Geyer rejects contract offers from Northern Eagles to re-sign with Melbourne.
 26 July – Northern Eagles halfback Matt Orford signs a two-year contract with Melbourne to replace Brett Kimmorley for the 2001 season.
 Round 26 – Melbourne secure sixth spot on the NRL ladder with a 36–26 win over Wests Tigers. In the first meeting between the teams since the spear tackle incident earlier in the season, Stephen Kearney is jeered by the Tigers' fans, but scores a late try to give Storm the lead. Wests Tigers  John Hopoate is cited in the match for contrary conduct relating to 10 separate incidents, including a head slam tackle on Scott Hill.
 5 August – Robbie Ross signs a four-year contract to stay with the club.
 Qualifying Final – Melbourne are defeated by Newcastle Knights 30–16 at a packed Marathon Stadium. Melbourne are then eliminated from the finals after seventh placed Parramatta Eels beat Sydney Roosters under the McIntyre final eight system. The result happens as Storm are on their flight back to Melbourne.
 9 August – Brett Kimmorley is named Rugby League Week's player of the year.
 16 August – Wayne Evans is released by the club as midseason signing Brenton Pomery is signed for the 2001 season.
 28 August – It is revealed that Melbourne and Canterbury-Bankstown Bulldogs plan to play their first match of the 2001 season in Hong Kong.
 24 September – Paul Marquet announces he has signed a one-year contract to return to Newcastle Knights.
 3 November – Melbourne strike a deal with Colonial Stadium management to play all 2001 season home games at the venue, leaving Olympic Park. Plans to play the club's opening game in Hong Kong are cancelled.
 19 December – Adecco sign a three-year $4m sponsorship agreement with Melbourne to have their logo on the front of Storm jerseys beginning with the 2001 season.

Milestone games

Jerseys
Melbourne's jerseys were again manufactured by Fila and carried the same designs as the 1999 home and away jerseys. A special "Millennium" jersey design was worn in the 2000 World Club Challenge and again in round 5 against St George Illawarra Dragons. Using the home design as a template, the jersey featured reflective silver thunderbolts. The gold away jersey was only worn in rounds 19, 22, and 26.

Fixtures

Pre Season

Regular season

Source:

Finals

Ladder

2000 Coaching Staff
Head coach: Chris Anderson
Assistant coaches: Greg Brentnall & Steve Anderson
Physiotherapist: Greg Gibson 
Head trainer: Steve Litvensky
Strength and conditioning Coach: Aaron Salisbury

2000 Squad
List current as of 4 August 2021

Player movements

Losses
 Ben Anderson to Released
 Paul Bell to Leeds Rhinos
 Tristan Brady-Smith to Released
 Daniel Frame to Released
 Aseri Laing to Released
 Glenn Lazarus to Retirement
 Dane Morgan to Wests Tigers
 Tawera Nikau to Warrington Wolves
 Craig Smith to Retirement

Gains
 John Lomax from North Queensland Cowboys
 Dane Morgan from North Sydney Bears
 Brenton Pomery from Wests Tigers
 Setariki Rakabula from Fiji

2000 World Club Challenge team

Representative honours
This table lists all players who have played a representative match in 2000.

Statistics
This table contains playing statistics for all Melbourne Storm players to have played in the 2000 NRL season.

Statistics sources:

Scorers

Most points in a game: 24 points 
 Round 5 - Tasesa Lavea (2 tries, 8 Goals) vs St George Illawarra Dragons

Most tries in a game: 4 
 Round 20 - Matt Geyer vs Auckland Warriors

Winning games

Highest score in a winning game: 70 points 
 Round 5 vs St George Illawarra Dragons

Lowest score in a winning game: 16 points
 Round 7 vs Parramatta Eels
 Round 16 vs Brisbane Broncos

Greatest winning margin: 60 points 
 Round 5 vs St George Illawarra Dragons

Greatest number of games won consecutively: 3
 Round 5 – Round 7
 Round 11 – Round 13
 Round 20 – Round 22

Losing games

Highest score in a losing game: 22 points
 Round 4 vs Penrith Panthers
 Round 23 vs Canterbury-Bankstown Bulldogs

Lowest score in a losing game: 4 points 
 Round 18 vs St George Illawarra Dragons

Greatest losing margin: 46 points 
 Round 18 vs St George Illawarra Dragons

Greatest number of games lost consecutively: 4 
 Round 1 - Round 4

Feeder Team
Melbourne Storm reserve players again travelled to Brisbane each week to play with Queensland Cup team Norths Devils. Making the finals for the third straight season, Norths Devils finished fifth and were eliminated in the first week of the 2000 Queensland Cup finals. Steven Bell won the Devils player of the year award, earning himself a contract with Melbourne for the 2001 season.

Awards and honours

Trophy Cabinet
 2000 World Club Challenge Trophy
 Michael Moore Trophy (Round 20)

Melbourne Storm Awards Night
Melbourne Storm Player of the Year: Rodney Howe 
Melbourne Storm Rookie of the Year: Tasesa Lavea  
Melbourne Storm Clubman of the Year: Richard Swain  
Mick Moore Chairman's Award: Paul Marquet

Dally M Awards Night
 Dally M Halfback of the Year: Brett Kimmorley
 Dally M Rookie of the Year: Tasesa Lavea

Additional Awards
 World Club Challenge Medal: Brett Kimmorley
 Rugby League Annual – Players of the Year: Brett Kimmorley
 Rugby League Annual – Team of the Year: Robbie Kearns 
 Rugby League Annual – Team of the Year: Scott Hill

Notes

References

Melbourne Storm seasons
Melbourne Storm season